Posht Ju (also Romanized as Posht Jū and Posht Jow; also known as Shahīd Raḩīmī-ye Yek and Shahīd Raḩīmī-ye Yek va Do) is a village in Miyankuh-e Sharqi Rural District, Mamulan District, Pol-e Dokhtar County, Lorestan Province, Iran. At the 2006 census, its population was 48, in 11 families.

References 

Towns and villages in Pol-e Dokhtar County